Bracon femoralis is a species of wasp that belongs to the family Braconidae. The scientific name of the species was first published and made valid by Brulle in 1832.

References

"Fauna Europaea : Taxon Details." Taxon Details. Fauna Europaea, 29 Aug. 2013. Web. 

Braconinae
Insects described in 1832